Gustavo Santa (born 8 October 1945) is a Colombian footballer. He competed in the men's tournament at the 1968 Summer Olympics.

References

External links

1945 births
Living people
Colombian footballers
Colombia international footballers
Olympic footballers of Colombia
Footballers at the 1968 Summer Olympics
People from Pereira, Colombia
Association football forwards
Atlético Nacional footballers
Deportivo Pereira footballers